Daniil Ratnikov (born 10 February 1988) is an Estonian professional footballer who plays mainly as an attacking midfielder.

Career
Born in Tallinn, Ratnikov came through the youth ranks at TVMK Tallinn, reaching the first team at 16.

Personal life
His father Sergei is a former international player for Estonia and football manager, while his brother Eduard Ratnikov was also a professional footballer.

Career stats

References

External links
 
 Soccernet.ee profile

1988 births
Living people
Footballers from Tallinn
Estonian footballers
Estonian people of Russian descent
Tartu JK Tammeka players
FC TVMK players
JK Narva Trans players
PFC Cherno More Varna players
JK Tallinna Kalev players
FCI Levadia Tallinn players
Estonian expatriate footballers
Estonian expatriate sportspeople in Bulgaria
Expatriate footballers in Bulgaria
First Professional Football League (Bulgaria) players
JK Sillamäe Kalev players
Meistriliiga players
Association football midfielders